Eszter Spät is a Hungarian academic and journalist, who specializes in Yezidi religion and in its relationship with the Kurdish independence movement. She directed the documentary Following the Peacock, which explored the lives of a Yezidi community in Sinjar in northern Iraq.

Education 
In 1996 Spät was awarded a MA degree in Classical Philology from Eötvös University, Budapest, presenting a thesis entitled: “Priscillian – Monk, Heretic, Martyr, Astrologer". In 1999 she was awarded a second MA degree in English Language and Literature at the same university, with a thesis entitled: "The Pelagian Movement in the British Isles”. In 1999 she also earned a MA degree in Medieval Studies at the Central European University, Budapest, with a thesis entitled: "Manichaeism in the anti-Manichaean Literature: The Figure of Mani in the Acta Archelai". In 2009 she was awarded her PhD in Medieval Studies from the Central European University, Budapest, defending a thesis entitled: "Late Antique Motifs in Yezidi Oral Tradition".

From 2011 to 2016 Spät was funded by a postdoctoral research grant from the Hungarian Scientific and Research Fund (OTKA). From 2011 to 2012 she obtained a research grant from the Gerda Henkel Foundation for research in Iraq and Germany. From 2014 to 2015 she was appointed as a Visiting Research Fellow at Ruhr-University Bochum. In 2016 she was a Visiting Research Fellow at Zentrum Moderner Orient, Berlin. She has published on Gnosticism and Manichaeism. She has also worked as a war correspondent.

Yezidi scholarship 

Spät specializes in Yezidi religion and in its relationship with the Kurdish movement. Her work demonstrated that there had been a resurgence in Yezidi religious practices in a "post-ISIS" political climate. She has also recorded Yezidi histories and beliefs around fermans (similar to pogroms). her work has also recorded Yezidi responses to the story of Shahid bin Jarr. As a result of her research in Iraq in 2011 and 2012, Spät also made the anthropological documentary, Following the Peacock. This documentary followed a local group from northern Iraq, the Yezidi Sinjar community, and to show their traditions.

Bibliography

Books 

 Eszter Spät, Late Antique Motifs in Yezidi Oral Tradition, Gorgias Press: (NJ) Piscataway, 2010.
 Ezster Spät, The Yezidis, SAQI Books: London, 2005.

Articles and book chapters 

 Ezster Spät, “Yezidi Oral Tradition: A Yezidi Myth as told by Feqir Haji.” (Hung.) In Irodalmi Szemle 58.12, 2015, 5-14.
 Ezster Spät, “’Falling into Book.’ Yezidi Seers in Modern Iraq.“ (Hung.) In Spiritual Mediators (Hung.: Spirituális Közvetítők). Karoli Books Series. Ed. M. Vassányi, E. Sepsi, V. Voigt. Budapest: L’Harmattan, 2014.
 Ezster Spät, "The Peacock Sanjak, Yezidi Oral Tradition and Identity.” (Hung.) In Axis: Journal of Religious History 5, 2014, 1-17.
 Ezster Spät, “On Soil and Jinn: Ritual Practices and Syncretism among the Yezidis of Iraq.” In Rituale als Ausdruck von Kulturkontakt: „Synkretismus” zwischen Negation und Neudefinition. Studies in Oriental  Religions 67. Ed. A. Pries, L. Martzolff, R. Langer and C. Ambos, 111-130. Wiesbaden: Harrassowitz, 2013.
 Ezster Spät, “Religion and Oral History: The Origin Myth of the Yezidis.” In Remembering the Past in Iranian   Societies. Ed. C. Allison and P. Kreyenbroek. Göttinger Orientforschungen IRANICA Neue Folge 9. Harrassowitz.
 Ezster Spät, “A Gnostic Myth in the Modern Middle East: The Yezidi „Son of a Jar” and Seth.” (Hung.) Ókor 10.2, 2011, 14-24.
 Ezster Spät, “In Lieu of Prayer: Yezidi Shrines in Northern Iraq.” (Hung.) In Áldozat és Ima (Sacrifice and Prayer.) Ed. K. B. Hoppál, Zs. Szilágyi, M. Vassányi, 154-169. Vallástudományi Könyvtár V. Budapest: L’Harmattan, 2011.
 Ezster Spät, "The Song of the Commoner: The Gnostic Call in Yezidi Oral Tradition.” In In Search of Truth: Augustine, Manichaeism and Other Gnosticism. Ed. J. A. van den Berg and J. van Schaik, 663-683. Leiden: Brill, 2011.
 Ezster Spät, “The Role of the Peacock “Sanjak” in Yezidi Religious Memory.” In Materializing Memory: Archeological Material Culture and the Semantics of the Past. BAR International Series 1977. Ed. A. Choyke-J. Rasson-I. Barbiera, 105-116. Oxford: Archeopress, 2009.
 Ezster Spät, "Religious Oral Tradition and Literacy Among the Yezidis of Iraq.” Anthropos 103.2, 2008, 393-404.
 Ezster Spät, “Late Antique Literary Motifs in Yezidi Oral Tradition: The Yezidi Myth of Adam.” Journal of American Oriental Society 128.4, 2008, 663-79.
 Ezster Spät, “The ‘Teachers’ of Mani in the Acta Archelai and Simon Magus.” Vigiliae Christianae 58.1, 2004, 1-23.
 Ezster Spät, “Changes in the Oral Tradition of the Yezidis of Iraqi Kurdistan.” The Journal of Kurdish Studies 5, 2004, 73-83.
 Ezster Spät, “The Festival of Sheikh Adi in Lalish, in the Holy Valley of the Yezidis.” Annual of Medieval Studies at CEU (Central European University, Budapest) 10, 2004, 147-57.
 Ezster Spät, “Shehid bin Jerr, Forefather of the Yezidis and the Gnostic Seed of Seth.” Iran and the Caucasus 6, no. 1-2, 2002, 27-56.
 Ezster Spät, “Some Topoi in the Description of Heretics in Early Christian Literature: Simon Magus, pater omnium haereticorum.” (Hung.) In Studia Patrum. Eds. P. Nemeshegyi – Z. Rihmer, 71-82. Budapest: Szent István Publishing House, 2002.
 Ezster Spät, “The Commonitorium of Orosius on the Teachings of the Priscillianists.” Acta Antiqua Hungarica 38, 1998, 357-379.
 Ezster Spät, “The Teachings of Priscillian in the Writings of the Church Fathers.” (Hung.) Antik Tanulmányok – Studia Antiqua 42, 1998, 137-152.  
 Ezster Spät, “The Literary Image of a Heretic Bishop in the 5th Century.” (Hung.) Ókortudományi Értestő 1.1, 1997, 21-27.

References

External links 
 Eszter Spat Discusses Her Documentary at YouTube
 Following the Peacock: A Documentary by Eszter Spät at YouTube

Classical scholars
Hungarian women academics
Central European University alumni
Year of birth missing (living people)
Living people